Edwin Curtis Bailey (June 10, 1816 – August 19, 1890) was an American newspaper editor and postmaster.

Biography
Bailey was born on June 10, 1816, in Albany, New York. He served as the postmaster of Boston from 1853 to 1857, and was a commander of the Ancient and Honorable Artillery Company of Massachusetts.

Bailey later was the owner and editor of the Boston Herald, until he sold the newspaper in 1869. He subsequently moved to New Hampshire and became publisher of the Concord Patriot in Concord. In 1878, Bailey was hired by Charles H. Taylor to be editor of The Boston Globe, a position he held until 1880. 

Bailey died as the result of a train wreck in Quincy, Massachusetts, on August 19, 1890. He was buried in Forest Hills Cemetery in the Jamaica Plain neighborhood of Boston.

References

Further reading

External links

1816 births
1890 deaths
People from Albany, New York
Massachusetts postmasters
Boston Herald people
The Boston Globe people
19th-century American newspaper editors
Editors of Massachusetts newspapers
Railway accident deaths in the United States
19th-century American newspaper publishers (people)